Foy Draper (November 26, 1911 – February 1, 1943) was an American track and field athlete  who won a gold medal in 4 × 100 m relay at the 1936 Summer Olympics. As a University of Southern California student, Draper won the IC4A championships in 200 m in 1935.

He reportedly held the world record for the 100-yard dash, at the time that would have been a hand timed 9.4, made all that more remarkable with Draper standing only 5'5".

At the Berlin Olympics, Draper ran the third leg in the American 4 × 100 m relay team, which won the gold medal in a world record time of 39.8.

During World War II, Draper served as a pilot on a twin-engine attack bomber A-20B 'Havoc' in Thelepte, Tunisia. On January 4, 1943, Draper took off to take part in the battle of Kassarine Pass. Draper and his two crewmen never returned and his death date is usually given as February 1, 1943. He is buried in the North Africa American Cemetery and Memorial administered by the American Battle Monuments Commission in Carthage, Tunisia. His gravestone shows January 4, 1943 as his date of death.

References

External links

 

1911 births
1943 deaths
American male sprinters
United States Army Air Forces bomber pilots of World War II
United States Army Air Forces personnel killed in World War II
Athletes (track and field) at the 1936 Summer Olympics
Olympic gold medalists for the United States in track and field
University of Southern California alumni
Track and field athletes from California
Medalists at the 1936 Summer Olympics